Stegania cararia, the ringed border, is a species of moth of the  family Geometridae. It is found from France east to Russia. It is an immigrant in Great Britain. The habitat consists of damp forested areas.

The wingspan is 20–23 mm. Adults are on wing from May to mid-July in one generation per year.

The larvae feed on poplar (Populus species), including aspen (Populus tremula).  Larvae can be found from July to October.

References

External links
 Lepiforum.de

Abraxini
Moths described in 1790
Moths of Europe
Taxa named by Jacob Hübner